Anantharamu Krishnappa(), born in Krishnaraja Nagara, Mysore District is a writer and a publisher. He has won the prestigious Sahitya Akademi Award for Kannada three times for his works. He publishes his work himself under the banner "Anantha Prakashana". He also won the Karnataka Rajyotsava Award in 2004 and the Ranna Sahitya Award in 2006.

Bibliography

Travelogues
 Udaya Raviya Naadinalli - Expo 70, Japan travelogue (Kannada Sahitya Academy Award)
 Sakkareya Seeme - Karnataka State, Mandya District travelogue (Kannada Sahitya Academy Award)
 Dakshinada Sirinaadu - Karnataka State,Dakhisna Kannada district travelogue (Kannada Sahitya Academy Award)

Research
 Kavi Brahmashiva - Doctoral Research work.

Vachanas
 Devara Dasimayya - 101 Independent Vachanas

References
Ramayana Mahanveshanam The Hindu May 2005
Rajyotsava Awards Deccan herald October 2004
City Today Deccan Herald April 2006

Writers from Mysore
Indian travel writers
Kannada-language writers
Living people
Recipients of the Rajyotsava Award 2004
Year of birth missing (living people)